The Deanery of Christianity may refer to two different deaneries of the Church of England:

 Deanery of Christianity (Lincoln)
 Deanery of Christianity (Exeter)